Sandia Peak may refer to:

 Sandia Crest, the high point of the Sandia-Manzano Mountains
 Sandia Peak Ski Area, the first ski resort in New Mexico
 Sandia Peak Ski Co.
 Sandia Peak Tramway, the world's second longest continuous-cable aerial tramway, located at the ski resort